Elizabeth Cheshire is an American actress known for appearing in the films as Airport '77 (1977), Looking for Mr. Goodbar (1977), Sunshine Christmas (1977), Melvin and Howard (1980) and Strange Behavior (1980), and television series such as The Family Holvak and Sunshine.

Cheshire is the daughter of Jerry and Enid Cheshire, and she has three older sisters.

Television appearances
 The Family Holvak (1975)
 Sunshine (1975)
 Captains and the Kings (1976)
 Ark II (1976)
 Highway to Heaven - Season 5, Episode 6: The Source

Filmography
 Ark II Episode "the Robot" (1976) Nestra
 Looking for Mr. Goodbar (1977)
 Airport '77 (1977) - Bonnie Stern
 Sunshine Christmas (TV) (1977)
 And I Alone Survived (1978)
 Melvin and Howard (1980)
 The Awakening of Candra (1981)
 Fallen Angel (TV) (1981)
 Strange Behavior (1981)
 Moving Midway'' (2008)

References

External links

American television actresses
American film actresses
Living people
1967 births
People from Burbank, California
21st-century American women